Universal Orlando Resort, commonly known as Universal Orlando or simply Universal, formerly Universal Studios Escape, is an American theme park and entertainment resort complex based in Orlando, Florida. The resort is operated by Universal Destinations & Experiences, a division of Comcast's NBCUniversal. Universal Orlando is the second-largest resort in Greater Orlando, after nearby Walt Disney World Resort. Universal Orlando covers 541 acres of land.

Universal Orlando consists of two theme parks (Universal Studios Florida and Universal's Islands of Adventure), an on-site waterpark (Volcano Bay), an on-site entertainment district (Universal CityWalk), eight Loews Hotels (Loews Portofino Bay Hotel, Hard Rock Hotel, Loews Royal Pacific Resort, Cabana Bay Beach Resort, Loews Sapphire Falls Resort, Universal's Aventura Hotel, Endless Summer Dockside Inn and Suites and Surfside Inn and Suites), and it will soon add a new theme park (Epic Universe) with an accompanying hotel.

All of the hotel resorts offer Early Park Admission into The Wizarding World of Harry Potter and Universal's Volcano Bay. Additionally, the Loews Portofino Bay Hotel, Hard Rock Hotel and Loews Royal Pacific Resort offer free unlimited Universal Express Pass for use at participating Universal Studios Florida and Universal's Islands of Adventure attractions. There are similar products valid at Volcano Bay, Halloween Horror Nights, and Rock the Universe.

Universal Orlando is one of the most visited resorts in the world with an annual attendance of 21 million in 2017. Universal Orlando is the flagship resort of Universal Destinations & Experiences, largely due to the competitive nature between the resort and Walt Disney World, which is only 15 miles away.

History
Universal Orlando opened on June 7, 1990 as the theme park Universal Studios Florida. It was opened as a joint venture between Universal Entertainment and The Blackstone Group. The park was in direct competition with Disney-MGM Studios (now called Disney's Hollywood Studios).

In 1994, executives started planning the expansion of the resort into a multi-day vacation destination. In late 1995, construction began on a new park, Islands of Adventure. The Islands of Adventure Preview Center opened in May 1997 replacing the Screen Test Home Video Adventure. During this time, several new attractions were being built and opened at Universal Studios Florida, including Woody Woodpecker's KidZone, which opened in 1998, Men in Black: Alien Attack and Animal Actors On Location! (formerly Animal Planet Live).

On May 28, 1999, Universal's Islands of Adventure opened to the general public. It featured six themed "islands", including the Port of Entry, Seuss Landing, The Lost Continent, Jurassic Park, Toon Lagoon, and Marvel Super Hero Island. The park opened to mediocre attendance, and several attractions were closed shortly thereafter, including Island Skipper Tours due to lack of attendance.

Along with the new theme park, the resort also opened a Florida version of Universal CityWalk from Universal Studios Hollywood. While it is the same concept, CityWalk Orlando was given different venues and design. Universal also opened the resort's first onsite hotel in September 1999. Loews Portofino Bay Hotel (originally Portofino Bay Hotel, a Loews Hotel) was operated and partially owned by Loews Hotels but was also partially owned by Universal and The Blackstone Group. The two theme parks, CityWalk, and the hotel were branded as Universal Studios Escape, however the name was quickly changed to Universal Orlando Resort.

In December 2000, Hard Rock Hotel opened as Universal Orlando's second onsite hotel. Despite its name, the hotel is owned by Loews Hotels, like Loews Portofino Bay Hotel and is not affiliated with Hard Rock International. In 2001, Loews Royal Pacific Resort opened. In the midst of all these openings, two parking garages were constructed and the popular water park Wet 'n Wild Orlando was acquired.

In 2003, rumors began swirling that a Harry Potter themed attraction would be coming to Universal or one of the Disney parks. On May 31, 2007, Universal, in partnership with Warner Bros., officially announced that the Wizarding World of Harry Potter would be built as the seventh of the Islands of Adventure park. The attraction opened on June 18, 2010.

Shortly after the success of the grand opening of the Wizarding World of Harry Potter - Hogsmeade, rumors began to swirl once again, this time of a second Potter-themed area in Universal Studios Florida. It was announced shortly thereafter that Universal would begin construction of The Wizarding World of Harry Potter -Diagon Alley, replacing Jaws: The Ride. On July 8, 2014, Diagon Alley officially opened to the public.

The Blackstone Group sold its stake in Universal Orlando in early 2011.

Theme parks

Universal Studios Florida
The original theme park in the resort, Universal Studios Florida, opened on June 7, 1990, as a theme park that let visitors "Ride the Movies." The park is composed of themed areas and attractions based on the film industry. Visitors get themed dining and shopping, a variety of special events throughout the year, and may even catch an actual film crew at work on the backlot.

The themes of Universal Studios Florida are targeted at making guests feel like they are on a movie set with rides, shows, and attractions inspired by popular film, television, and music productions. The park consists of nine themed areas – Hollywood, Production Central, New York, San Francisco, The Wizarding World of Harry Potter - Diagon Alley, World Expo, Springfield, Minions Land on Illumination Avenue, and Woody Woodpecker's Kidzone.

Universal's Islands of Adventure
The second park to open at the resort was Universal's Islands of Adventure, opened on May 28, 1999. It is composed of eight distinct "islands" that are themed to various forms of adventures from literature. Visitors start off in the Port of Entry and make their way through the various islands – Marvel Super Hero Island, Toon Lagoon, Skull Island, Jurassic Park, the Wizarding World of Harry Potter - Hogsmeade, the Lost Continent, and Seuss Landing. The Wizarding World of Harry Potter, based on the popular Harry Potter franchise, as well as Skull Island, based on the King Kong 2005 film, are the only islands that were added after the park opened. Hogsmeade opened to the public on June 18, 2010 and Skull Island opened to the public on July 13, 2016.

Universal's Volcano Bay
Volcano Bay is a 27-acre themed water park that opened in 2017. It replaced Wet 'n Wild, owned by Universal, as the resort's water park. Wet 'n Wild was founded in 1977 by SeaWorld founder George Millay as one of the first major water parks. In 1998, Wet 'n Wild was acquired by Universal Destinations & Experiences, adding it to Universal Orlando. There were eighteen water slides and attractions at the water park. Popular attractions included the Storm, Bomb Bay, Disco H2O, Mach 5, and the Surge.

Wet 'n Wild was located at the intersection of International Drive and Universal Boulevard, about half a mile south of the Universal Orlando parking garage. Wet 'n Wild officially closed on December 31, 2016, due to the opening of Volcano Bay. It was announced on March 21, 2017 that the land once occupied by Wet 'n Wild would be transformed into Universal's seventh hotel. It was later learned that Universal would split the property into two hotels that were part of one resort.

Universal's Epic Universe
On August 1, 2019, NBCUniversal announced that it was building a third theme park called Universal's Epic Universe. It will be located a few miles south of the existing resort, within a larger 750-acre site. There are rumored to be five lands including a central hub and four other areas themed to How to Train Your Dragon, Wizarding Paris from the Fantastic Beasts franchise, Universal Classic Monsters, and Super Nintendo World. It was stated that the project would create 14,000 jobs. Brian Roberts, the CEO of Comcast, called Epic Universe "the largest investment we've ever made in a park". The complex will also include separate resort hotels, dining and retail facilities.

In April 2020, NBCUniversal announced the park's opening would be delayed until 2024 due to the COVID-19 pandemic. In July 2020, NBCUniversal and Jeff Shall announced that they would be pausing development on the new theme park "until the future becomes more certain". In March 2021, work on Epic Universe resumed.

As of March 2023 Epic Universe is slated to open in the summer of 2025.

Entertainment district

Universal CityWalk Orlando is an entertainment and retail district which opened on May 28, 1999 over the former parking lot and entrance of Universal Studios as part of the expansion that created the Universal Orlando Resort. Guests arrive at the resort park in one of two multi-story parking structures, then travel via covered moving sidewalks over Universal Boulevard into CityWalk. From there, guests can proceed into one of the theme parks.

The Universal Store is its flagship store, offering merchandise from the three parks. CityWalk features shopping, nightclubs, dining venues, and a Cinemark Theater and offers varying live music and entertainment options each night. Notably CityWalks's Rising Star (a karaoke club with a live band), Red Coconut Club, and Bob Marley - A Tribute to Freedom (both a night club and restaurant). Some notable restaurants include the Cowfish, Hard Rock Cafe, Jimmy Buffett's Margaritaville, Bubba Gump Shrimp Company, Antojito's Authentic Mexican Food, and Bigfire American Fare. Casual dining locations include: Moe's Southwest Grill, BK Whopper Bar, Panda Express, Red Oven Pizza Bakery, and Voodoo Doughnut.

Resorts
The resort features eight official on-site hotels, totaling up to 9,000 rooms. All eight hotels are located in close proximity to the Universal Orlando theme parks. The hotels offer guests free water taxi or shuttle bus service to the Universal Orlando theme parks. The hotels are sorted into four categories: premier hotels, a preferred hotel, prime value hotels, and value hotels.

Events

Universal's Halloween Horror Nights

On select nights in September through early November, Universal Studios Florida is transformed for the annual Halloween event, Halloween Horror Nights. Halloween Horror Nights, or HHN as it is more commonly known, is one of the largest Halloween events in the U.S. From 1991 to 2001, the event was held at Universal Studios Florida. Halloween Horror Nights was moved to Islands of Adventure in 2002, and the 2004 event featured sections of both parks, but the event was moved back to Universal Studios Florida in 2006. The event celebrated its 20th anniversary in 2010, its 25th anniversary in 2015, and the 30th anniversary in 2021. The event sometimes features an "icon" that presides over the terror each evening, along with ten haunted houses and numerous unavoidable scare zones. It is a separately ticketed event.

Rock the Universe

Rock the Universe is an annual Christian rock music festival that is located within Universal Studios Florida. It began in 1998 and has been running ever since. The event typically occurs in early September and lasts for two days. In 2019, Rock the Universe took place in early February for the first time ever. Many Christian rock artists play throughout the event both nights. The resort offers special tickets, packages and church partnerships for that weekend. Select attractions are also open throughout the evenings.

Grad Bash and Gradventure
Grad Bash and Gradventure are two separate events held in April and May at the parks. Grad Bash is an event for graduating high school senior classes who can gather for an exclusive, all-night party at Universal Orlando and Islands of Adventure. This event features live performances by some of the most popular artists, dance parties with DJs, and pre-parties at the Universal Music Plaza Stage in the Production Central section of Universal Studios Florida. Gradventure is very similar but is designed for graduating middle school students. Both events are sponsored by Coca-Cola.

Universal's Holiday Parade featuring Macy's
Macy's Holiday Parade brings some authentic balloons from the Macy's Thanksgiving Day Parade to Orlando in a 2 month long event in November and December that highlights the Christmas celebrations within Universal Studios Florida.

Mardi Gras

Generally, in February through to April, a parade and concert series inspired by New Orleans' Fat Tuesday party is held within Universal Studios Florida. The event features merchandise especially for the celebration and is held usually on Friday and Saturday nights. Every event night guests will hear some of Louisiana's bands performing blues and zydeco. It is included in park admission.

Other services

Universal Express Pass

Many attractions in Universal Studios Florida and Islands of Adventure allow guests to utilize an Express Pass, with availability depending at each attraction. This pass admits guests to a separate line for the attraction, which is given priority status when boarding.

Express Pass is not a virtual queuing service. Instead, passholders may enter the Universal Express line whenever they wish. This pass is not included with park admission but can be bought for an additional fee. Fees change depending on date. Guests can choose to purchase one of two options: Express Pass, which gives guests access to the express line once per day on each participating attraction, or Express Unlimited Pass, which allows guests to skip the regular lines an unlimited number of times per day at participating attractions.

Universal Meal Deal
The Universal Meal Deal was a ticketed meal plan for park visitors. It allowed visitors of either theme park to eat all day long from lunch through dinner at select restaurants. These included Mel's Drive-In and Louie's Italian Restaurant at Universal Studios Florida and Circus McGurkus Cafe Stoo-pendous, Comic Strip Cafe, and the Burger Digs at Universal's Islands of Adventure.

The selection food was limited and drinks were not included. Beverages could be purchased through a Universal Souvenir Cup. For additional costs, visitors could add park-to-park Meal Deal Access allowing them to eat meals in both parks.

Universal Meal Deal was replaced on November 3, 2013 with Universal Quick Service Dining Plan.

Blue Man Group

On November 9, 2006, Universal Orlando announced that the Blue Man Group would be coming to the resort in a new theater. In May 2007 the theater was named the Sharp Aquos Theatre with Construct beginning shortly afterward. The theater is contained within Sound Stage 18, which was occupied by Nickelodeon Studios from 1990 to 2005. The sound stage was home to shows such as Slime Time Live, Legends of the Hidden Temple, Figure It Out, and Double Dare 2000. In 2005, the sound stage was used for Where Evil Hides, a haunted house for Universal's Halloween Horror Nights: Tales of Terror event. The theater is located between the Hard Rock Cafe and the main entrance to Universal Studios Florida.

The 1,000-seat theater would feature a  Blue Man facade and be accessible both from the Universal CityWalk as well as the Universal Studios theme park. In preparation for the rezoning of the building into CityWalk, a walkway was constructed between the Universal Studios theme park and Hard Rock Cafe, allowing guests to enter the theater without paying admission to the theme park. Meanwhile, the former Nickelodeon Studios entrance at the theme park was turned into an attended exit from the theme park to the theater's entrance.

The theater's seating diagram was organized into five different "zones". The "Poncho" zone consists of the first four rows of the theater. It bears this name because of the ponchos that were in each seat of the zone as guests took their seats. They were needed to protect guests from due to possible materials leaving the stage. Zones 1–4 were arranged to provide the best possible view of the show no matter where you sat. The theater had 13 ADA seats throughout to comply with the Americans with Disabilities Act of 1990. Assistance for the hearing and vision impaired was also available.

On February 1, 2021, it was announced that the Blue Man Group would be ending their residency at Universal Orlando.

Character dining
Universal Orlando features a large group of characters varying from Woody Woodpecker to Spider-Man. Visitors have three ways of dining with characters. At Loews Royal Pacific Resort, guests can eat breakfast with Universal Characters on select days. Throughout the day, characters have meet and greets within the parks and make appearances during lunchtime at several theme park restaurants. During dinner, on select nights, guests can dine with Universal characters at Trattoria del Porto, The Kitchen and Islands Dining Room. The Marvel Super Heroes also appear in the Meet the Marvel Super Heroes attraction where the characters ride on motorcycles down the street of Marvel Super Hero Island.

Transportation

Throughout Universal Orlando and its vicinity, there is an organized transportation system, shuttling guests between onsite hotels, Universal Partner Hotels, theme parks, and other area attractions. Mears Transportation runs this system.

Orlando's LYNX bus system connects the resort to other places in the city.

The transit system at Universal Orlando Resort consists of water taxis, buses, escalators, elevators, moving walkways, and pathways, taking guests between parking structures, hotels, CityWalk, and theme parks.

Onsite hotel guests can get to the theme parks and CityWalk by either boarding a water taxi directly to CityWalk or using walkways. The dock at CityWalk is located at the center of CityWalk and can be accessed by theme park visitors via the bridges connecting CityWalk to the theme parks. Along the pathways, bicycles are available to guests for an additional cost.

Dedicated buses are available at the onsite hotels. Along with the buses, Cabana Bay Beach Resort features two large parking structures, for day and night guests who need to park, connected by bridge to CityWalk and the theme parks.

Universal's Super Star Shuttle
Several hotels and a major airport are located within 20 minutes of Universal Orlando. Universal's Super Star Shuttle service is broken into two main routes. One provides transportation to all thirty Universal Partner hotels while the newest route began service to Orlando International Airport in 2016. Universal's Super Star Shuttle provides free transportation between Universal Orlando, SeaWorld and Aquatica. Airport service is available for a fee to onsite hotel guests booking through Universal Parks and Resorts Vacations. The airport shuttle is run by Mears Transportation. The Seaworld/Aquatica shuttle is run by ESCOT.

Gallery

See also
Incidents at Universal Orlando

References

External links

 
1990 establishments in Florida
Amusement parks opened in 1990
Companies based in Orlando, Florida
Resorts in Florida
Tourist attractions in Greater Orlando
Tourist attractions in Orange County, Florida